Miguel Reina Santos (born 21 January 1946) is a Spanish retired footballer who played as a goalkeeper.

He played 312 La Liga matches over 16 seasons, mainly in representation of Barcelona and Atlético Madrid (seven years apiece), winning six major titles.

Club career
Born in Córdoba, Andalusia, Reina finished his development with local Córdoba CF. He made his La Liga debut on 11 October 1964 in a 2–0 home win against Elche CF, aged only 18, and finished his first season with 26 appearances as his team ranked in fifth position.

Reina joined FC Barcelona in the 1966 off-season, totalling only four league games in his first three years as he acted as understudy to both José Manuel Pesudo and Salvador Sadurní. From 1969–70 onwards he became the starter, going on to win his second Copa del Rey with the Catalans – the first as an active member – and adding the Ricardo Zamora Trophy for the 1972–73 campaign (all 34 matches played for the runners-up and only 21 goals conceded, posting a record of 824 minutes without a goal which would last until 1 November 2011 when he was surpassed by Víctor Valdés).

Aged 27, Reina left Barça and signed for Atlético Madrid, rarely missing a game in his first five seasons and winning the 1977 national championship, his only in the competition. He also reached the final of the 1974 European Cup against FC Bayern Munich at the Heysel Stadium in Belgium: after 90 minutes the match was tied 0–0 and, in the 114th minute, Luis Aragonés scored for the Colchoneros, but Reina let in a long-range shot with just seconds to go and the Spaniards went on to lose the replay 4–0.

From 1978 to 1980, Reina only managed to be third choice at Atlético, and retired at the age of 34 with nearly 450 competitive matches to his credit. He held the record for the fastest goalkeeper to achieved 100 clean sheets in La Liga – a feat which he accomplished in 222 appearances – until it was broken by Jan Oblak in 2020, who achieved the milestone in only 182.

International career
Reina earned five caps for Spain, in a period of three and a half years. His debut came on 15 October 1969 in a 6–0 win against Finland for the 1970 FIFA World Cup qualifiers, played at La Línea de la Concepción.

Previously, Reina was selected by manager José Villalonga for his 1966 World Cup squad in England, remaining on the bench for the entire tournament.

Personal life
Reina's son, Pepe, was also a goalkeeper. He too played for Barcelona and Spain, also representing Liverpool for several years.

In the 1970–71 season, Reina was only played by English coach Vic Buckingham away from the Camp Nou as the player was consistently booed by his own fans after a poor performance against FC Dynamo Moscow.

Reina was elected to his hometown's council in 2011, for the People's Party. He supported prison for the leaders of the Catalan independence movement.

Honours
Barcelona
Copa del Generalísimo: 1967–68, 1970–71
Inter-Cities Fairs Cup: 1971

Atlético Madrid
La Liga: 1976–77
Copa del Generalísimo: 1975–76
Intercontinental Cup: 1974
European Cup runner-up: 1973–74

Spain U18
UEFA European Under-18 Championship runner-up: 1964

Individual
Ricardo Zamora Trophy: 1972–73, 1976–77

References

External links

FC Barcelona profile

1946 births
Living people
Footballers from Córdoba, Spain
Spanish footballers
Association football goalkeepers
La Liga players
Córdoba CF players
FC Barcelona players
Atlético Madrid footballers
Spain youth international footballers
Spain under-23 international footballers
Spain amateur international footballers
Spain international footballers
1966 FIFA World Cup players
People's Party (Spain) politicians
Sportsperson-politicians